Knowsley Hall Music Festival is a music festival based at Knowsley Hall in Merseyside, near Liverpool. It is commonly abbreviated to 'KHMF' or 'Knowsley'. It was created by the CEO of Cream and Creamfields, James Barton, and Lord Edward Stanley the Lord of the Manor for Knowsley Hall. The first festival was in 2007 and the headline acts were The Who and Keane.

Beginnings
James Barton of Cream wanted to create a rock music festival in the North West to rival that of the other great festivals across Britain after the success of his Creamfields dance music festival. The event was co-produced by Cream and festival management firm Loud Sound, which already organises Creamfields, the Isle of Wight’s Bestival and RockNess in Scotland. Barton approached Lord Derby to use the grounds of Knowsley Hall as it was an ideal venue for an atmospheric festival he said. Lord Derby was more than happy to take part in the organising of the first ever KHMF, after the success of a Status Quo concert there the previous year. With Barton's contacts and experience and with Lord Derby's estate, the north west was set to have the biggest festival ever to take place there. The Who, The Coral, The View, and Keane were the first acts to be signed up, The Zutons then followed. Many more acts followed, with Joss Stone and special guests: Madness, being added to the Sunday event due to minor complaints of not enough acts being announced for the Sunday early on. The many other acts were announced various weeks later during the build-up to the festival.

2007

Lineup

External links
 Official KHMF website
 KHMF MySpace

Music festivals in Merseyside
2007 establishments in England
Music festivals established in 2007